One-way or one way may refer to:

One-way traffic, a street either facilitating only one-way traffic, or designed to direct vehicles to move in one direction
One-way travel, a trip that does not return to its origin

Music
One Way (American band), American R&B-funk band popular from late 1970s through the 1980s
One Way (South Korean band), South Korean R&B/hip hop group managed by YJ Media

Albums
One Way (Selwyn album), Australian R&B singer Selwyn's second album
One Way (Turbo album), the tenth studio album by Polish heavy metal band Turbo
One Way of Life - the Best of the Levellers

Songs
"One Way", a song by Loona yyxy from Beauty & the Beat
"One Way", a song by Thelma Aoyama from Diary
"One Way", a single by The Levellers from their 1991 album Levelling the Land

Other uses
One Way (2006 film), a film by Reto Salimbeni
One Way (2022 film), an American action thriller
One Way is a two part documentary series produced by Channel News Asia in 2022.
One-Way (novel) (French Un aller simple), a 1994 novel by French writer Didier Van Cauwelaert
One-way function, a function that is easy to compute on every input, but hard to invert given the image of a random input
One-way encryption, in computer science
One-way mirror, a glass through which one can see only in one way
Check valve, also a one-way valve
Single-use, or disposable products

See also 

One Way or Another (disambiguation)
One-to-one (disambiguation)
One-to-many (disambiguation)